Nikolay Blagoyev Georgiev (born June 18, 1960 in Plovdiv) is a Bulgarian sprint canoer who competed in the early 1990s. He finished eighth in the K-4 1000 m event at the 1992 Summer Olympics in Barcelona.

References

 Sports-Reference.com profile

1960 births
Bulgarian male canoeists
Canoeists at the 1992 Summer Olympics
Living people
Olympic canoeists of Bulgaria
Sportspeople from Plovdiv
20th-century Bulgarian people